Srednja Bloudkova was a ski jumping K90 hill located in Planica, Slovenia, that existed between 1949 and 2012.

History
The hill was opened in 1949 and constructed by Slovenian engineer Stanko Bloudek. The hill has a perfect location and the first original inrun was made of thin steel stick construction. His main assistant at the construction of this hill was Stano Pelan, Slovenian pilot, constructor, bank officer, working supervisor, credited as Planica expert, FIS judge of ski jumping and technical judge delegate. This hill is also known under his name.

The winner of a first international opening competition on this hill on 27 March 1949 was Janez Polda. The winner of the last international competition on March 28, 1971, was East German Hans-Georg Aschenbach.

The winner of the first World Cup competition on 21 March 1980 was Austrian Hans Millonig.

Constructors of the present hill are brothers Vlado and Janez Gorišek. They reconstructed the hill in 1989. In hill axis there was a wooden sculpture of a ski jumper.

The last World Cup event was on 11 December 1994 with Austrian winner Andreas Goldberger. In total there were 11 individual World Cup competitions. The last official ski jumping event on this hill was held on the 2007 FIS Nordic Junior World Ski Championships replacing Tarvisio, a venue dealing with a lack of snow. Those were also the last ski jumps ever at this hill.

As a part of Planica Nordic Centre renovation, the hill was completely demolished in late 2012. It stands just a few meters away from Stano Pelan Hill and right next to the Bloudkova velikanka. After they demolished Stano Pelan Hill, they built two completely new medium ski jumping hills at the same place, which are used for training. They are HS 62 and HS 80 size. Those two smaller hills opened in December 2013.

Competititions

Ski jumping

Nordic combined

Hill record

Men

Ladies

See also 
 Letalnica bratov Gorišek
 Bloudkova velikanka
 Planica Nordic Centre

References 

Ski jumping venues in Slovenia
Sports venues completed in 1949
Sports venues demolished in 2012
Defunct sports venues in Slovenia
Demolished buildings and structures in Slovenia
Demolished sports venues
20th-century architecture in Slovenia
1949 establishments in Yugoslavia
2012 disestablishments in Slovenia